Another Shore is a 1948 Ealing Studios comedy film directed by Charles Crichton.  It stars Robert Beatty as Gulliver Shields, an Irish customs official who dreams of living on a South Sea island; particularly Rarotonga. It is based on the 1947 novel by Kenneth Sheils Reddin, an Irish judge.

Plot

The opening credits initially say "a comedy" but this is changed to "a tragedy". The orchestra plays Molly Malone as credits roll on a background of shamrocks telling the viewer that the setting is Ireland.

Gulliver Sheils has left his career with the Revenue Commissioners in Dublin due to receiving a small pension. He spends every day but Sunday sitting at a park bench in St Stephen's Green hoping to help a fallen wealthy elderly person who will reward him with enough money to finance his one way trip to Rarotonga where he will spend the remainder of his days lolling about in the South Seas. On Sunday he loafs on an Irish beach fantasising about living in Rarotonga. There he meets an attractive Anglo-Irish woman named Jennifer (Moira Lister).  She becomes intrigued that Gulliver is the first man to ignore her.

The next week, a refined Scottish gentleman, Alastair McNeil (Stanley Holloway) sits next to him for some minutes before going to a bar. Gulliver goes to a different bar. A very quiet one. He reads a newspaper article about a car crash on Grafton Street; he realises that that location would give him a better opportunity for his scheme. He then goes to the street and waits for the next accident, but when two women crash he declines to be a witness. He waits a week on the courtroom steps .. the woman eventually sees him .. they had met before on a beach. He goes to meet her later in a bar with her friends.

He resumes his stance on the steps of the bank on Grafton Street but is harassed due to his continual presence. Acquiring a small performing dog from an ill street busker partly resolves this. He is happy when the next accident happens: an old lady is hit by a car while crossing. He helps her hoping for a reward but is only given a luncheon voucher.

The girl Jennifer passes somewhat tipsy and asks him to call a taxi. He joins her and they go to her palatial home. Over dinner he at last explains his plan. In his mind, he will rescue and they will reward him with an amount of money to get him to the South Seas. She clearly likes him but he runs off.

He returns to his position on Grafton Street. The next accident is a Rolls-Royce hitting a boy on a bicycle. The man (the same man who earlier sat by him in the park) in the car claims the greater injury. They go to a bar together. They appear to have parallel dreams except Gulliver seeks Rarotonga and the man wishes Tahiti. They meet a third time in a lawyers office when the man goes to bewail the loss of his wife: running away with his chauffeur. A plan to go together to the South Seas  is formulated to the dismay of Jennifer.

On the way to the boat their car crashes on Grafton Street. Gulliver breaks his arm. Jennifer arrives and her friend Yellow takes Gulliver's place on the trip. Gulliver stays with Jennifer who he marries with Gulliver returning to his job.

Main cast
 Robert Beatty – Gulliver Sheils
 Moira Lister – Jennifer
 Stanley Holloway – Alastair McNeil, the rich man
 Michael Medwin – "Yellow" Bingham
 Sheila Manahan – Nora
 Fred O'Donovan – Coghlan
 Maureen Delany – Mrs Gleeson
 Dermot Kelly – Boxer
 Irene Worth – Bucsy Vere-Brown 
 Bill Shine – Bats Vere-Brown 
 Muriel Aked – Old lady
 Wilfrid Brambell – Arthur Moore, the lawyer
 Michael J. Dolan – Twiss

Production
Another Shore was filmed on location in Dublin in Ireland.

References

External links

Review at Variety

1948 films
British comedy films
British black-and-white films
Ealing Studios films
1948 comedy films
Films directed by Charles Crichton
Films set in Ireland
Films shot in the Republic of Ireland
Films scored by Georges Auric
1940s English-language films
1940s British films